Jonathon Riley may refer to:

 Jonathon Riley (British Army officer) (born 1955), British Army officer and military historian
 Jonathon Riley (athlete) (born 1978), American middle- and long-distance runner

See also
Jonathan Riley-Smith (1938-2016), British historian of the Crusades